Synodontis vanderwaali is a species of upside-down catfish native to Angola, Botswana and Namibia where it occurs in the upper Zambezi River, the Okavango River and Delta and the Cunene River.  This species grows to a length of  SL.

References

External links 

vanderwaali
Catfish of Africa
Freshwater fish of Angola
Fish of Botswana
Freshwater fish of Namibia
Fish described in 1990